Eduardo Chapero-Jackson (born 1971) is a Spanish film director. He is best known for his short films.

References

External links 

1971 births
Living people
Spanish film directors